A combined 273 artists have won the television series Idols, a reality singing competition adapted in forty-six regions. The series, originally created by British television executive Simon Fuller as Pop Idol, aims to find the most outstanding independent solo singer. Through mass auditions, a group of semi-finalists is selected by a panel of judges based on their performances. The finalists are then selected amongst a group of semi-finalists by the television audiences and the judges (through wildcard rounds), with the finalist receiving the most votes by the television audiences in their weekly performance being declared the winner.

Each winner is given a recording contract, a monetary prize, and a title as that nation's Idol, SuperStar or Star. The first winner of the format was Will Young of the United Kingdom in 2002. Two winners of the series were also able to win for another regional title: Kurt Nilsen of Norway also won World Idol in 2003, and Hady Mirza of Singapore also won Asian Idol in 2007. In addition, Jason Hartman and Sasha-Lee Davids of South Africa were the only two finalists to be declared as co-winners of the format.

Winning the Idols series provides a unique opportunity for the winning artist(s) to launch or further their music careers, due to the surrounding publicity and the recording contract offerings. However, only a few of them have managed to further their international careers. The most notable winner of the series was Kelly Clarkson of the United States, who has sold over 70 million records worldwide. Other notable winning artists who also have managed to chart internationally include Agnes Carlsson of Sweden, Alexander Klaws of Germany, Kurt Nilsen of Norway, Guy Sebastian of Australia, Carrie Underwood of the United States, and Young of the United Kingdom.

Winners

National versions

Multinational versions

Junior competitions

Winner competitions

Notes

 Citizens of Macedonia were eligible to participate in the first season.
 Citizens of Hong Kong, Macau, and Taiwan are eligible to participate throughout the series.
 Citizens of Wallonia and Québec were eligible to participate in the first season.
 Citizens of Austria and Switzerland are eligible to participate throughout the series.
 Citizens of Cyprus were eligible to participate in Super Idol.
 Citizens of Moldova were eligible to participate in SuperStar România.
 Citizens of Belarus and Ukraine were eligible to participate in the first and second season.
 Citizens of Puerto Rico were eligible to participate in the eighth season.
 Countries whose citizens were eligible to participate include all the member states of the Arab League.
 Countries whose citizens were eligible to participate include: Botswana, Burundi, Comoros, Djibouti, Ethiopia, Eritrea, Kenya, Lesotho, Madagascar, Malawi, Mauritius, Mozambique, Namibia, Réunion (a part of France), Rwanda, Seychelles, Somalia, Swaziland, Tanzania, Uganda, Zambia and Zimbabwe.
 Countries whose citizens were eligible to participate include all of the Latin American countries, with the exception of Brazil.
 Countries whose citizens were eligible to participate include: Benin, Burkina Faso, Cape Verde, Côte d'Ivoire, Gambia, Ghana, Guinea, Guinea-Bissau, Liberia, Mali, Mauritania, Niger, Nigeria, Saint Helena, Senegal, Sierra Leone and Togo.
 Winners of Indian Idol, Indonesian Idol, Malaysian Idol, Philippine Idol, Singapore Idol, SuperStar KZ, and Vietnam Idol participated in Asian Idol, in which the winner was determined the greatest percentage of votes.
 Winners of inaugural seasons of American Idol, Australian Idol, Canadian Idol, Deutschland sucht den Superstar, Idool, Idols (Dutch version), Idols (South African version), Idol (Polish version), Idol (Norwegian version), Pop Idol, and SuperStar (Arab version) participated in World Idol, in which the winner was determined by the most collective points given by each of the other participating countries (similar to the Eurovision Song Contest).

References

 
Idols (TV series) winners
Non-British television series based on British television series
Television shows remade overseas